Donald Briggs (January 28, 1911 – February 3, 1986) was an American actor, who appeared in over 75 films and television shows between the 1930s and 1970s.

Early life
Briggs was born in Chicago, Illinois and died in Woodland Hills, California at age 75. He was a graduate of Senn High School in Chicago and worked at KYW radio in 1928.

Radio
Briggs played the title roles in The First Nighter Program, The Sheriff, Perry Mason, and The Adventures of Frank Merriwell.

Family
Briggs was married to actress Audrey Christie.

Filmography

Film

Television 

Source:

References

External links

 
 
 Donald Briggs, Films available at Internet Archives

1911 births
1986 deaths
American male film actors
American male television actors
American male radio actors
20th-century American male actors
Male actors from Chicago